Alphonse Ruckstuhl (born 30 September 1901, date of death unknown) was a Swiss fencer. He competed in the individual and team sabre events at the 1936 and 1948 Summer Olympics.

References

1901 births
Year of death missing
Swiss male fencers
Olympic fencers of Switzerland
Fencers at the 1936 Summer Olympics
Fencers at the 1948 Summer Olympics